Shanghang Road Subdistrict is a subdistrict located on the central part of Hedong District, Tianjin. it shares border with Xiangyanglou Subdistrict in the north, Wanxin Subdistrict in the east, Zhongshanmen and Dazhigu Subdistricts in the southwest, and Tangjiakou Subdistrict in the northwest. It was home to 66,164 residents as of 2010.

Its name is taken from Shanghang Street that runs through the subdistrict.

History

Administrative divisions 
As of the time in writing, Shanghang Road Subdistrict consisted of 15 communities. They are organized in the following list:

References 

Township-level divisions of Tianjin
Hedong District, Tianjin